"Good Girls Don't" is a 1979 song by The Knack.

It may also refer to:
 Good Girls Don't (TV series), a 2004 sitcom created by Carsey-Werner-Mandabach
 Good Girls Don't..., a 1987 album by Finnish hard rock band Peer Günt

See also
 Good Girls Don't Wear Trousers, 1989 novel by Lara Cardella
 Volevo i pantaloni (film), 1990 (also known as Good Girls Don't Wear Trousers and I Wanted Pants)